"Cold" is a song by Scottish singer-songwriter Annie Lennox. It was released as the fourth single from her first solo album, Diva (1992), and reached no. 26 in the UK. The single was released as a series of three separate CD singles, titled Cold, Colder and Coldest. Each CD featured the track "Cold" as well as a collection of live tracks. It was the first single to chart in the UK Top 40 without being released on vinyl. A cassette version was also available featuring the lead track and one live track from each CD.

Critical reception
Stephanie Zacharek from Entertainment Weekly called the song "comfortable", "with the gospel and blues touches on". A reviewer from Kingston Informer said it is "brilliant". Robbert Tilli from Music & Media described it as "nicely waltzing". Music Week named it Pick of the Week, declaring it as a "torchy and simple ballad, offering further evidence of the quality of Annie's album Diva." In an retrospective review, Pop Rescue noted that it "feels like a slow late night jazz club number", adding that Lennox' vocals "are soft but rich here and it really shows her off perfectly." The reviewer also felt that "at times, its downbeat sound feels a little reminiscent" of lead single "Why". 

Harry Dean from Smash Hits complimented the song as "pleasantly melodic". Craig S. Semon from Telegram & Gazette wrote, "'Cold' lives up to its name. This moody showpiece has a sparse keyboard arrangement that comes in like sheets of ice, with Lennox's unsettling voice as harsh as an arctic frost. It also has some of Lennox's best images and phrasing expressing heartache and regrets. During the song's most telling moment, she explains, "Dying is easy, it's living that scares me to death/I could be so content hearing the sound of your breath"."

Music video
A music video was made to accompany the song, directed by British director Sophie Muller. It was later published on YouTube in October 2009. As of November 2020, the video has been viewed over 4.5 million times.

Track listing

All tracks except "Cold" were recorded acoustically live for MTV Unplugged in July 1992.  All live songs were versions of songs from Diva.

All tracks except "Cold" were recorded acoustically live for MTV Unplugged in July 1992.  All live songs were versions of songs Lennox has recorded with the Eurythmics.

All tracks except "Cold" were recorded acoustically live for MTV Unplugged in July 1992.  All live songs were cover versions.  "River Deep, Mountain High" was originally done by Ike & Tina Turner.  "Feel the Need" was by The Detroit Emeralds.  "Don't Let Me Down" is a Beatles song.

Charts

References

External links

1992 singles
Annie Lennox songs
Songs written by Annie Lennox
Song recordings produced by Stephen Lipson
1992 songs
Arista Records singles
1990s ballads
Soul ballads
Music videos directed by Sophie Muller